The women's 50 metre backstroke event at the 2014 Commonwealth Games as part of the swimming programme took place on 28 and 29 July at the Tollcross International Swimming Centre in Glasgow, Scotland.

The medals were presented by Helen Jaques, Aquatics Competition Manager, Glasgow 2014 and the quaichs were presented by Miriam Moyo, Commonwealth Games Federation Regional Vice-President, Africa and President of the National Olympic Committee of Zambia.

Records
Prior to this competition, the existing world and Commonwealth Games records were as follows.

The following records were established during the competition:

Results

Heats

Semifinals

Final

References

External links

Women's 050 metre backstroke
Commonwealth Games
2014 in women's swimming